St. Agnes Hospital may refer to:
St. Agnes Hospital (Baltimore)
St. Agnes Hospital (Fond du Lac, Wisconsin) operated by the Congregation of Sisters of St. Agnes
St. Agnes Hospital (Raleigh, North Carolina)